Przykorwin - is a Polish coat of arms. It was used by several szlachta families in the times of the Polish–Lithuanian Commonwealth.

See also

 Polish heraldry
 Heraldry
 Coat of arms
 List of Polish nobility coats of arms 
 Korwin coat of arms

Sources 
 Dynastic Genealogy 
 Ornatowski.com 

Polish coats of arms